Walter Walsh (1907–2014) was an FBI agent and Olympic shooter.

Walter Walsh may also refer to:
 Walter Walsh (writer) (1847–1912), English Protestant author
 Walter Walsh (minister) (1857–1931), Scottish minister and peace advocate
 Walter Walsh (hurler) (born 1991), Kilkenny player
 Walter Walsh (courtier), courtier at the court of Henry VIII of England
 Walt Walsh (1897–1966), baseball player